Budapest is the capital of Hungary.

Budapest may also refer to:

Places
 Budapest, Georgia, United States
 Budapest, Missouri, United States

People with the name
 Zsuzsanna Budapest (born 1940), feminist author

Arts, entertainment, and media

Music
 Budapest (band), a British post-grunge rock band, formed 1999
 "Budapest" (song), a 2013 song by George Ezra
 "Budapest", a 1980s song by Jethro Tull from Crest of a Knave
 "Budapest", a 2005 song by Poni Hoax
 Budapest Live, a 1980s live album by Manfred Mann's Earth Band

Other uses in arts, entertainment, and media
 Budapeste, a 2003 novel by the Brazilian writer Chico Buarque
 Budapest (film), a 2018 French comedy movie by Xavier Gens
 Budapest Gambit, a chess opening that is now rarely played at the top level